Islamophobia in Germany refers to the set of discourses, behaviors and structures which express feelings of anxiety, fear, hostility and rejection towards Islam and/or Muslims in Germany. Islamophobia can manifest itself through discrimination in the workforce, negative coverage in the media, and violence against Muslims. Various Islamic groups in Germany have expressed concerns over the attacks targeting mosques.

References

 
Islam in Germany